The Akukan mine  operated during 1927-1932 for the excavation of muscovite (potash mica). It was located in the Akukan Ravine of the Akukan River, north of Baikal Lake, Buryatia, 40 km North-East-East off Nizhneangarsk, 7 km North of the village Kholodnaya (now settlement Kholodhy).

There are documentary indications that to man the mine a Special-Purpose Camp (lager osobogo naznachenia) of OGPU was operated. At the same time there are documents regarding the use of the labor of "special settlers". In August 1932 the mine was closed as exhausted. The locals refer to the mine site as "the former labor camp". In the collection "The Beloved Northern Land" compiled by N.K Kiselyova the place is referred to both as a labor camp and a special settlement. It is conjectured that the camp operated until 1931, and the special settlement thereafter.

Currently a tourist trail exists from the automobile road to the site.

References

Camps of the Gulag
Mines in the Soviet Union